The Journal of Food Biochemistry is a peer-reviewed scientific journal that covers research on the effects of handling, storage, and processing on the biochemical aspects of food. It was established in 1977 and is published by Wiley-Blackwell. The journal moved to online-only publication in 2011.

References

External links 
 

Bimonthly journals
Wiley-Blackwell academic journals
English-language journals
Publications established in 1977
Food science journals